Season 1881–82 was the fifth in which Hibernian competed at a Scottish national level, entering the Scottish Cup for the fifth time.

Overview 

Hibs reached the fifth round of the Scottish Cup, losing 6–2 to Dumbarton.

Results 

All results are written with Hibs' score first.

Scottish Cup

See also
List of Hibernian F.C. seasons

Notes

External links 
 Results For Season 1881/1882 in All Competitions, www.ihibs.co.uk

Hibernian F.C. seasons
Hibernian